Jan Bašný (born 29 January 1963) is a Czech handball coach for the Czech women's national team.

References

1963 births
Living people
Czech handball coaches
Handball coaches of international teams